St Leonards was an electoral district of the Legislative Assembly in the Australian state of New South Wales, created in 1859, partly replacing Sydney Hamlets, and named after the Sydney suburb of St Leonards, which then included North Sydney, its main settlement. It extended from North Sydney to Broken Bay, including the Northern Beaches. It elected one member from 1859 to 1882, two members from 1882 to 1889 and three members from 1889 to 1894. With the abolition of multi-member constituencies in 1894, it was replaced by the single-member electorates of St Leonards, Warringah and Willoughby. In 1920, with the introduction of proportional representation, it was absorbed into North Shore.

Members for St Leonards

Election results

References

Former electoral districts of New South Wales
Constituencies established in 1859
1859 establishments in Australia
Constituencies disestablished in 1920
1920 disestablishments in Australia